The 1953 Lincoln Blue Tigers football team was an American football team that represented Lincoln University of Missouri as a member of the Midwest Athletic Association (MAA) during the 1953 college football season. In their fifth season under head coach Dwight T. Reed, the Tigers compiled an 8–0–1 record. The team was ranked No. 4 among the 1953 black college teams with a Dickinson System rating of 24.25, behind Tennessee A&I (25.83), Prairie View (25.00), and Florida A&M (24.50).

Schedule

References

Lincoln
Lincoln Blue Tigers football seasons
College football undefeated seasons
Lincoln Blue Tigers football